The 3rd Dáil was elected at the 1922 general election on 16 June and met on 9 September. On its formation, it was a Constituent Assembly in a Provisional Parliament. From 6 December 1922, Dáil Éireann was the lower house of the Oireachtas in the Irish Free State. Members of the Dáil are known as TDs. The 3rd Dáil was dissolved by Governor-General Tim Healy on 9 August 1923, at the request of the President of the Executive Council W. T. Cosgrave. The 3rd Dáil lasted  days.

Composition of the 3rd Dáil

Pro-Treaty Sinn Féin, marked with bullet, formed a Dáil Ministry when the Third Dáil met on 9 September 1922. It formed the 1st Executive Council of the Irish Free State on 6 December 1922, led by W. T. Cosgrave as President of the Executive Council. It formed the Cumann na nGaedheal party in April 1923.

Graphical representation
This is a graphical comparison of party strengths in the 3rd Dáil from June 1922. This was not the official seating plan.

Sinn Féin (Pro-Treaty) is shown on the right.
Sinn Féin (Anti-Treaty) is shown on the left, though they did not take their seats.

Ceann Comhairle
On 9 September 1922, Michael Hayes was proposed by Ernest Blythe and seconded by Patrick Hogan for the position of Ceann Comhairle, and was approved without a vote. Pádraic Ó Máille was proposed by Piaras Béaslaí and seconded by Liam de Róiste for the position of Leas-Cheann Comhairle, and also approved without a vote.

On 6 December 1922, when the Dáil first met under the new constitution, Hayes was proposed by W. T. Cosgrave and seconded by Thomas Johnson for the position of Ceann Comhairle, and was approved without a vote. De Róiste was proposed as Leas-Cheann Comhairle by George Nicolls and seconded by Seán McGarry, and also approved without a vote.

TDs by constituency
The list of the 128 TDs elected is given in alphabetical order by Dáil constituency.

Changes
No by-elections were held for vacancies during the 3rd Dáil.

References

External links
Houses of the Oireachtas: Debates: 3rd Dáil

 
3rd Dáil
03